Ciroyom Station is a railway station that located near Arjuna street at Andir, Bandung. The station located just on the east side of Ciroyom traditional market.

The station also located only 500 meters on the west side of Bandung Station.

Services
There are only a few train stop in this station :

References

External links
 
  Ciroyom Train Station

Buildings and structures in Bandung
Railway stations in West Java